The Farm Debt Review Act was an Act of the Parliament of Canada dealing with the farm crisis affecting Canadian agriculture in the 1980s. It was in force from 1986 to 1998.

Background
Farm credit increased significantly in the late 1970s as Canadian farmers expanded their operations to meet greater world demand with expectations of continuing high commodity prices for their production. In the early 1980s, prices collapsed, and annual interest rates suddenly rose from 10% to as high as 24%. Similar, but more severe, conditions had been previously encountered during the Great Depression of the 1930s.

In September 1985, a moratorium had been placed on all foreclosure actions by the Farm Credit Corporation. To provide debt relief on a nationwide basis, the Act was introduced in June 1986, and received Royal Assent later that month.

Framework

Scope
The Act's scope was broad, as noted in its definitions:

 a "farmer" included any individual or entity engaged in farming
 "farming" included the production or raising of any animal or thing on a farm
 an "Insolvent farmer" meant any farmer who could not meet obligations as they came due, had ceased paying current obligations in the ordinary course of business as they came due, or whose property (valued either at fair market value or at a value obtained at a fairly conducted sale under legal process) is insufficient to enable payment of all obligations, due and accruing due
 farmers who were not insolvent, but were in financial difficulty, also came within certain provisions of the Act

Its aim was to "help farmers with the potential to be viable and remain in business." The significance of its framework was later described thus by one commentator:

Operation
The Act's operation was conducted in a decentralized manner:

 Farm Debt Review Boards were established for each province, or a region of a province, and each Board had power to appoint experts and establish review panels to help in their functions
 farmers in financial difficulty were able to have a review panel either review his financial affairs or assist him in facilitating an arrangement with his creditors
 insolvent farmers could apply to a Board for a review of his financial affairs and for a stay of proceedings against him by any of his creditors, following which a review panel would be appointed to facilitate an arrangement between the farmer and the creditors which would be administered by a licensed trustee
 insolvent farmers who had made an application would be barred from making another application during the following two years, unless written consent had been previously given by the Board
 secured creditors were required to give a notice of 15 business days before realizing upon the security, and the notice had to advise the farmer of his right to apply for a stay of proceedings
 the stay of proceedings was in effect for 30 days, and could be extended by the Board for a further three 30-day periods
 the Board had to appoint a guardian for the farmer's assets (which could be the farmer), and such guardian was subject to any directions given by the Board

Impact
The Act protected hobby farmers as well as commercial farmers, and the stay of proceedings applied to all the farmer's assets, whether connected to the farm or not. As well, a stay of proceedings under the Act voided any actions by a secured creditor, whether the stay was pleaded or not before a judge.

Aftermath
The Act would be in effect until the coming into force of the Farm Debt Mediation Act in 1998.

Notes

References

History of agriculture in Canada
Canadian federal legislation
Canadian insolvency legislation
1986 in Canadian law
Canadian corporate law
Agricultural law